Cosmo Cosmolino is a 1992 book by Australian writer Helen Garner. The book consists of three linked works: two short stories and a novella, though the author and critics have described it as a novel.

It was first published in Australia by McPhee Gribble and was shortlisted for the 1993 Miles Franklin Award. It has been reported that the novel's title is Garner's favourite, and came to her in a dream.

Short stories
In the first short story "Recording Angel", a woman goes to a hospital to see a gravely ill friend.
In the second short story "A Vigil", a man is forced to see the cremation of his girlfriend who suicided.

Novella
In the novella that gives the name to the book, freelance writer Janet owns a terrace house in Melbourne. The house was previously inhabited by a communal household.

Critical reception
The novel was critically well received.

References

External links
 Consider This: Helen Garner’s Cosmo Cosmolino - plot summary and review by Tegan Bennett Daylight in the Sydney Review of Books, 13 May 2016
 Garnering sales from The Sydney Morning Herald blog

Novels by Helen Garner
1992 Australian novels
Novels set in Melbourne